Funeral for Yesterday is the fourth album released by the heavy metal music group Kittie. The album was released on February 20, 2007 (April 3 in Canada) via the band's own label, X of Infamy Records, with distribution through EMI. The album was accompanied by a bonus DVD that shows behind-the-scenes footage of the band recording the album. It was the first album to feature guitarist Tara McLeod and the only album to feature bassist Trish Doan before she died in 2017.

The album debuted at #101 in the Billboard Top 200, selling 9,000 copies in its first week.

The album's lead single "Funeral For Yesterday" peaked at #40 on Billboard's Mainstream Rock Tracks chart, becoming the band's biggest hit single in the US.

Track listing
All songs written by Morgan and Mercedes Lander.

Personnel
Morgan Lander – lead vocals, guitars, piano 
Mercedes Lander – drums, percussion, backing vocals 
Tara McLeod – guitars 
Trish Doan – bass

References

2007 albums
Kittie albums